Sideridis is a genus of moths of the family Noctuidae raised by Jacob Hübner in 1821.

Species

 Sideridis africana (Berio, 1977)
 Sideridis arcanus Hreblay & Plante, 1995
 Sideridis artesta (Smith, 1903)
 Sideridis bombycia (Eversmann, 1856)
 Sideridis chersotoides Wiltshire, 1956
 Sideridis cholica (Hampson, 1905)
 Sideridis congermana (Morrison, 1874)
 Sideridis discrepans (Walker, 1865)
 Sideridis egena (Lederer, 1853)
 Sideridis elaeochroa (Hampson, 1919)
 Sideridis fuscolutea (Smith, 1892)
 Sideridis herczigi Varga & Ronkay, 1991
 Sideridis honeyi (Yoshimoto, 1989)
 Sideridis implexa (Hübner, [1809])
 Sideridis incommoda (Staudinger, 1888)
 Sideridis irkutica Sukhareva, 1979
 Sideridis kitti (Schawerda, 1914)
 Sideridis lampra (Schawerda, 1913)
 Sideridis lohi (Noel, 1906)
 Sideridis mandarina (Leech, 1900)
 Sideridis marginata Köhler, 1947
 Sideridis maryx (Guenée, 1852)
 Sideridis mojave (Benjamin, 1932)
 Sideridis peculiaris (Staudinger, 1888)
 Sideridis remmi Kononenko, 1982
 Sideridis reticulata – Bordered Gothic (Goeze, 1781)
 Sideridis rivularis – The Campion (Fabricius, 1775)
 Sideridis rosea (Harvey, 1874)
 Sideridis ruisa (Forbes, 1913)
 Sideridis satanella (Alphéraky, 1892)
 Sideridis sericea Warren, 1915
 Sideridis simplex (Staudinger, 1889)
 Sideridis stoliczkana (Moore, 1878)
 Sideridis suavina (Draudt, 1950)
 Sideridis texturata (Alphéraky, 1892)
 Sideridis turbida (Esper, 1790)
 Sideridis unica (Leech, 1889)
 Sideridis uscripta (Smith, 1891)
 Sideridis unicolor (Alphéraky, 1889)
 Sideridis vindemialis (Guenée, 1852)

Former species
 Sideridis palmillo is now Tricholita palmillo (Barner, 1907)

References
 Natural History Museum Lepidoptera genus database
 Sideridis at funet.fi

Hadenini
Taxa named by Jacob Hübner